Texas House Bill 2497, better known as the 1836 Project, was a bill created in June 2021 by the Texas House of Representatives and was signed into law by Greg Abbott, the Governor of Texas.

Development
House Bill 2497 was passed in June 2021, receiving support from Republicans and Democrats, and was signed into law by Texas Governor Greg Abbott. Republicans attached amendments to the bill requiring the project to also raise awareness of the state’s Christian heritage, its traditions of owning guns, and the Texas origins of the annual Juneteenth holiday. Democrats amended the bill and added requirements to include the contributions to the state by people of Hispanic ancestry. A requirement was also added by Democrats to include the historical roles that Texans have played in bolstering voting rights since the 1960s. House lawmakers passed the bill by a margin of 124 to 19.

The law went into effect on September 1, 2021, and will expire in 2036. The project is named after the year Texas won independence from Mexico during the Texas Revolution and is funded by the Texas Education Agency. The bill is meant to promote a "patriotic education" to the state’s residents. The 1836 Project is made up of a nine-member advisory committee tasked with promoting the state’s history to Texas residents, primarily through pamphlets given to people receiving driver’s licenses. Committee members were appointed by Abbott, Lieutenant Governor Dan Patrick and House Speaker Dade Phelan. The project also awards students for their knowledge of the state’s history and values through the Gubernatorial 1836 Award. The law details specific historical topics that are to be included in the project, including indigenous people, the state’s Spanish and Mexican heritage, Tejanos, and Juneteenth.

Criticism
The project's name was criticized by some because Texas’ independence didn’t apply to all people living in the state at the time, including slaves and indigenous groups. Critics, including Nikole Hannah-Jones, who created The 1619 Project, worried that the 1836 Project was created as a way to limit the teaching of critical race theory in schools and hide the country's history of racism. The project has also received criticism for promoting the "Christian heritage" of the state.

References

Texas statutes
2021 in Texas
2021 in American law